Daniel Anthony Thomas (born 1 September 1991) is a professional English footballer who plays as a goalkeeper for Gosport Borough.

Career
Thomas signed an apprentice contract with AFC Bournemouth in May 2008. He made his debut on 6 October 2009 for Bournemouth in their 2–1 away defeat to Northampton Town in the Football League Trophy Southern Section Second Round. Thomas commented, "I was chuffed to bits when I was told I was going to make my debut...I felt I did ok, but was just so disappointed to be on the losing side". He made his debut in the Football League on 5 December as a second-half substitute, replacing the injured Shwan Jalal, and kept a clean sheet as Bournemouth beat Shrewsbury Town 1–0 in Football League Two. On 4 February 2011, Thomas joined Dorchester Town on loan. He made his debut the next day in a 1–0 win over Weston-Super-Mare. He was recalled from his loan spell on 12 April 2011 after his parent club terminated the contract of the club's second choice goalkeeper Jon Stewart.

On 6 January 2012, Thomas joined Southern Football League Premier Division side AFC Totton on a month's loan. On 16 March 2012, it was announced that Thomas had joined Conference South side Havant & Waterlooville.

Thomas joined Aldershot Town on non-contract terms in August 2014 after impressing whilst on trial in pre-season.

Personal life
Thomas attended Portchester School, in Bournemouth and Brockenhurst College in Brockenhurst.

He has a two younger brothers, named Joseph and Nick.

References

External links
Bournemouth profile

1991 births
Living people
Sportspeople from Poole
Footballers from Dorset
English footballers
Association football goalkeepers
AFC Bournemouth players
Dorchester Town F.C. players
Welling United F.C. players
A.F.C. Totton players
Havant & Waterlooville F.C. players
Poole Town F.C. players
Aldershot Town F.C. players
English Football League players
National League (English football) players